The eighth awards ceremony saw lead actresses in film and television combined into the same category. Up until the 2018–2019 film season, awards were given for films released in Ireland the previous year.

Winners and nominees

2010s

2020s

Statistics

Multiple wins
5 wins:
 Saoirse Ronan

Multiple nominations
7 nominations::
 Saoirse Ronan

3 nominations:
 Seána Kerslake

2 nominations:
 Ruth Bradley
 Jessie Buckley
 Antonia Campbell-Hughes

See also
 Irish Film & Television Award for Best Supporting Actor
 Irish Film & Television Award for Best Supporting Actress – Film

References

Actress in a Lead Role - Film